Giovanni Omodei (died 1 February 1542) was a Roman Catholic prelate who served as Bishop of Mazara del Vallo (1530–1542).

Biography
On 14 December 1530, Giovanni Omodei was appointed by Pope Clement VII as Bishop of Mazara del Vallo. He served as Bishop of Mazara del Vallo until his death on 1 February 1542.

References

External links and additional sources
 (for Chronology of Bishops) 
 (for Chronology of Bishops) 

16th-century Italian Roman Catholic bishops
1542 deaths
People from Mazara del Vallo
Bishops appointed by Pope Clement VII